The men's 50m freestyle S9 event at the 2008 Summer Paralympics took place at the Beijing National Aquatics Center on 14 September. There were three heats; the swimmers with the eight fastest times advanced to the final.

Results

Heats
Competed from 10:38.

Heat 1

Heat 2

Heat 3

Final
Competed at 19:59.

Swimming at the 2008 Summer Paralympics